The Expedition of Usama bin Zayd was a military expedition of the early Muslim Caliphate led by Usama ibn Zayd that took place in June 632, in which Muslim forces raided Byzantine Syria. The expedition came three years after the Battle of Mu'tah.

After the Farewell Pilgrimage, the Islamic prophet Muhammad appointed Usama ibn Zayd as the commander of an expeditionary force which was to invade the region of Balqa in the Byzantine Empire. Muhammad sent Usama to Syria to avenge the Muslims' defeat at the Battle of Mu'tah, in which Usama's father and Muhammad's adopted son, Zayd ibn Harithah, had been killed.

Usama's campaign was successful and his army was the first Muslim force to successfully invade and raid Byzantine territory, thus paving the way for the subsequent Muslim conquest of the Levant and Muslim conquest of Egypt, both of which took place during Usama's lifetime.

Background
The Battle of Mu'tah was fought in September 629 near the village of Mu'tah, east of the Jordan River and Karak, between the forces of Muhammad and the forces of the Byzantine Empire and their Arab Christian Ghassanid vassals. In Islamic historical sources, the battle is usually described as the Muslims' attempt to take retribution against the Ghassanids after a Ghassanid official executed Muhammad's emissary who was en route to Bosra.  During the battle the Muslim army was routed. After three Muslim leaders (including Usama's father, Zayd ibn Harithah), were killed, the command was given to Khalid ibn al-Walid and he succeeded in saving the rest of the forces. The surviving Muslim forces retreated to Medina.

After the Farewell Pilgrimage in 632, Muhammad appointed Usama ibn Zayd as the commander of an expeditionary force which was to invade the region of Balqa in the Byzantine Empire. The stated aim of this expedition was to avenge the Muslim losses at the Battle of Mu'tah, in which Usama's father and Muhammad's adopted son, Zayd ibn Harithah, had been killed. Usama gathered a force of approximately 3000 men, of which 1000 were cavalry soldiers, and Abu Bakr had intended on joining Usama on campaign. Usama had also sent spies ahead of him, from which he learned that the enemy were still unaware of the imminent approach of his army. 

However, due to Muhammad's death on 8 June, the campaign was delayed and Abu Bakr was elected as Caliph in Medina. With the death of Muhammad, some Muslim leaders and citizens resisted going under the command of Usama because they thought that he, who was 20 at the time, was too young to lead an army.  Muhammad dismissed these concerns. This incident is also mentioned in the Sahih al-Bukhari. Certain companions of the prophet tried to persuade Abu Bakr, who succeeded Muhammad as leader of the Islamic community, to replace Usama as commander of the army with Umar Ibn Al-Khattab, due to Usama's youth. 

Abu Bakr was under great pressure regarding this expedition due to rising rebellion and apostasy across Arabia, but he was determined.  reaffirmed the decision of Muhammad and dispatched the expedition under Usama's leadership.

Expedition 

According to Al-Tabari, before Usama headed out and raided the inhabitants of Syria, Abu Bakr commanded Usama to follow ten rules of war. The tradition of the ten rules of Abu Bakr is also mentioned in the Sunni Hadith collection of Al-Muwatta.: 

Tabari states that the expedition was successful, and Usama reached Syria and became the first Muslim force to successfully raid Byzantine territory, thus paving the way for the subsequent Muslim conquests of Syria and Egypt from the Byzantine Empire.

This expedition became notable in Islam history due to how the still eighteen year old Usama was appointed as overall commander, leading veterans and high ranked companions of the prophet such as Umar, Sa'd ibn Abi Waqqas, Sa'id ibn Zayd, Abu Ubayda ibn al-Jarrah, and Qatada ibn al-Nu'man.

See also 
 List of expeditions of Muhammad
 Muslim conquest of the Levant
 Ridda Wars
 Ghazwa
 Islamic military jurisprudence
 Zayd ibn Haritha

References

Notes

Sources

Bibliography

 
 
 
 
 . Note: This is the free version available on Google Books

Invasions
630s conflicts
632
Heraclius